Desh Group is a Bangladeshi diversified conglomerate based in Dhaka. Rokeya Quader is the chairperson of Desh Group and Omar Quader Khan is the managing director. Vidiya Amrit Khan is the Group director. it was a pioneer of the garments industry in Bangladesh.

History 
Desh Group was established in 1974 by M. Noorul Quader. Desh International Limited was founded in 1974 as an importer of electric diesel locomotives. Tutelar Oil Services was established in 1974 as an importer of factory machinery.

Desh Garments was established in 1977 as an export oriented garment factory. It was the first export oriented garment factory in Bangladesh and a pioneer of the Textile industry in Bangladesh. The factory sent staff to South Korea to learn about the garments trade from Daewoo in the early 1980s.

Desh Agencies Limited was established in 1978 as a clearing and forwarding agency.

Desh Real Estate Limited was established in 1980 as an industrial land developer near Dhaka and Chittagong.

Jenk Industries Limited was established in 1988 as a manufacturer of cardboard boxes.

In 2008, Vidiya Amrit Khan, daughter of M. Noorul Quader took charge of Desh Garments in Chittagong. She hired a consultant from Germany and modernized the factory.

Businesses 

 Desh Garments
 Desh International Limited
 Tutelar Oil Services
 Jenk Industries Limited
 Desh Agencies Limited 
 Desh Real Estate Limited

See also 
 The World Bank Newsletter 1988
 The Economist Third World Survey 1989
 Far Eastern Economic Review 1991 Eager Weavers : Bangladesh garment boom spurs textile projects - Feature Author - S. Kamaluddin
 Far Eastern Economic Review 1996
 Bangladesh's Readymade Garments: The Challenge of Growth
 Bombay Sweets

References 

1974 establishments in Bangladesh
Organisations based in Dhaka
Conglomerate companies of Bangladesh